Jane Wanjiru Michuki is a Kenyan businesswoman, investor and lawyer. She is the Managing Partner at Kimani & Michuki Advocates, a corporate law firm based in Nairobi whose client list includes Equity Group Holdings Limited, the largest bank holding company on the African continent with over 9.2 million customers as of 30 June 2014.

She is the largest female stockholder on the Nairobi Stock Exchange (NSE), with an estimated net worth of approximately US$50 million, as of November 2014, making her one of the wealthiest people in Kenya.

Education and career
She was born and raised in Kenya, the largest economy in the East African Community. She attended the University of Nairobi, graduating with the degree of Bachelor of Laws. She also holds the postgraduate Diploma in Legal Practice, obtained from the Kenya School of Law. Her Master of Laws was obtained from Warwick University in the United Kingdom. She is one of two partners in the law firm of Kimani & Michuki Advocates, serving there as the Managing Partner.

Investment portfolio
Jane Wanjiru Michuki owns shares of stock in the publicly traded companies listed below, as of November 2014.
 

 Shares traded on Nairobi Stock Exchange.

See also
 List of wealthiest people in Kenya
 Economy of Kenya

References

External links
  Website of Kimani & Michuki Advocates

Living people
21st-century Kenyan businesswomen
21st-century Kenyan businesspeople
20th-century Kenyan lawyers
Kenyan women lawyers
Kikuyu people
Kenyan Christians
People from Nairobi
University of Nairobi alumni
Alumni of the University of Warwick
Kenya School of Law alumni
Year of birth missing (living people)
21st-century Kenyan lawyers